Roman Igorevich Tsepov (Russian: Роман Игоревич Цепов; 22 July 1962 – 24 September 2004) was a Russian businessman and confidant to Vladimir Putin during Putin's work at the Saint Petersburg City Administration. Tsepov was suspected of criminal and corruption activity.

Biography 
Born Belinson, Tsepov changed his surname upon marriage to Tsepov. Upon graduation from the Supreme Political school of the Ministry of Internal Affairs of the USSR, Tsepov served in the Internal Troops as a political commissar. In 1990, he retired from the Ministry of Internal Affairs at the rank of captain.

"Baltik-Eskort" 
In 1992, Tsepov founded the security firm "Baltik-Eskort" which became the largest such firm in St. Petersburg. The idea to create this agency belonged to the future Putin's bodyguard Viktor Zolotov who later oversaw this agency as a member of the active reserve. The firm provided protection to high ranking Saint Petersburg officials, including the city mayor Anatoly Sobchak and his family, as well as the vice-mayor Vladimir Putin. In this role, Tsepov also acted as an "intermediary between Putin and business" through which Baltik-Eskort collected the "black cash". At the same time, "Baltik-Eskort" rendered security services to a number of criminal leaders, in particular Aleksandr Malyshev, the leader of "Malyshev's gang" and his family and several figures of the Tambov Gang.

Criminal activity 
In 1994, Tsepov was arrested on charges of illegal storage of weapons and drugs. It is rumoured that the real reason for the arrest was the collection of "protection" money to secure gambling licenses from the city office of Vladimir Putin. Starting in 1993, there were five unsuccessful attempts on Roman Tsepov's life. His name appears in several criminal investigations, the last one being in March 1998 on charges of extortion of 70 thousand dollars. Tsepov went into hiding and fled to the Czech Republic.

Prominent businessmen 
Upon Vladimir Putin's coming to power, Tsepov became one of the most influential figures in the financial and political life of Saint Petersburg. He took part in the first presidential inaugural ceremony of Vladimir Putin. Tsepov's power and influence were attributed to his close association with then Minister of Internal Affairs Rashid Nurgaliyev, the chief of Presidential Security Service Viktor Zolotov (Zolotov attended Tsepov's funeral) and deputy head of presidential administration Igor Sechin. He was also affiliated with Saint Petersburg branches of the Russian Ministry of Internal Affairs and FSB. Journalists named Roman Tsepov "a security oligarch". Regarding all this real or rumored activity, Tsepov stated: "For some reason all the time Tsepov appeared to be the most convenient figure for rumors. Elections – Tsepov. Criminal investigations, tranches, credits, fuel business, security, a casino – Tsepov. Personnel rearrangements – me too. The grey cardinal necessarily should exist at a king's court". In the summer of 2004, Tsepov was rumored to attempt to mediate between the government and YUKOS.

Death by poisoning 
On 11 September 2004, Tsepov visited colleagues at a local FSB office where he had a cup of tea. On the same day, he felt unwell after which a very serious disease developed with symptoms such as vomiting, diarrhoea and a sudden drop of white blood cells. Treated in Hospital 31 in Saint Petersburg, he died on 24 September. A postmortem investigation found poisoning by an unspecified radioactive material. He had symptoms similar to Aleksander Litvinenko.

Film and television 
After playing a small part in Vladimir Bortko's mini-series Banditskiy Peterburg: Advokat (2000) Tsepov co-produced the Vladimir Bortko's mini-series My Honor (2004). The series was awarded a TEFI, the highest television award in Russia, as best film.

Personal 
He was close to Alexandra Tsepova, who was believed to be his wife, however, a close acquaintance believes that Alexandra only changed her last name to Tsepova from her maiden name. Alexandra Tsepova sold her apartment to Dina Tsilevich (born 1968 or 1969) who is a close friend of Svetlana Krivonogikh, allegedly owns the building at which Baltic Escort is headquartered, and is allegedly the mother of Viktor Zolotov's son.

See also 
 Aleksandr Litvinenko

References

Books

External links
 
 
 
 
 
 
 
 
 
 
 

1962 births
2004 deaths
People from Kolpino
Russian gangsters
Murdered Russian gangsters
Assassinated Russian people
Deaths by poisoning
Victims of radiological poisoning
People murdered in Russia
Burials at Serafimovskoe Cemetery